César Julio Valencia Copete (born August 24, 1951 in Cali, Valle del Cauca) is a Colombian lawyer and magistrate of the Supreme Court of Colombia. He is the former President of Supreme Court of Colombia.

Education

Valencia graduated from the Universidad Externado de Colombia in Bogotá with a specialization in Commercial law from the same university.

References

20th-century Colombian judges
Magistrates of the Supreme Court of Justice of Colombia
Presidents of the Supreme Court of Justice of Colombia
1951 births
Living people
People from Valle del Cauca Department
21st-century Colombian judges